Attack of the 50 Ft. Woman is a 1993 American science fiction comedy television film and is a remake of the 1958 film Attack of the 50 Foot Woman. Directed by Christopher Guest and starring Daryl Hannah and Daniel Baldwin, the film premiered on HBO on December 11, 1993, and was later theatrically released in the United Kingdom, France and Germany.

Plot
The film begins by following a tour group at a memorial museum dedicated to Nancy Archer. The patrons are shown a film with Dr. Loeb, who explains that the events surrounding Nancy Archer were true. Nancy was an heiress to her mother's fortune. Her father, Hamilton Cobb, hopes to use the money to gain control over the town they live in. Nancy sees her psychiatrist, Dr. Cushing, about her low self-esteem and bad marriage to Harry Archer. Her husband frequently spends time with a beautiful mistress, Honey Parker, the town beautician, together with whom he discusses his plans to steal the family's business away from Nancy's father. Despite her attempts to confront Harry, Nancy cannot express her anger in a healthy manner, allowing both her husband and father to take advantage of her.

While driving one night out in the desert, she sees a UFO, which shines a bright light at her. Even though she knows she will be the town's laughing stock, she also knows what she saw was real. She finally convinces Harry to accompany her on another night time drive in the desert, but the UFO is nowhere in sight. Suddenly, the ship descends from the sky. Getting out of the car for a closer look, Nancy is trapped by a bright light and disappears along with the UFO. Harry quietly returns to town and does not even report the kidnapping to the local authorities, Sheriff Denby and deputy Charlie.

A dazed Nancy is later found atop Honey's salon and is brought home. Her father is suspicious that Harry left her out in the desert while Harry denies any wrongdoing. Harry accuses Hamilton of neglecting his own wife after she was locked away at a sanitarium. As the two men argue, Nancy loses her temper, shouting that she can speak for herself and her mother. Suddenly, to everyone's surprise, she begins to grow; her clothes tear and rip as her head goes smashing through the ceiling into the attic.

The next morning Nancy is relocated to a large stable. There she is introduced to Dr Loeb. He observed a hormonal surge that occurred during Nancy's growth. Scared, Nancy asks that he find a cure, while keeping it a secret. Unable to convince her to move to a "controlled, therapeutic environment", Dr Loeb explains to Harry that Nancy's condition is unique and precarious. The strain of her heart to sustain her new size would make any stress too dangerous for her. This gives Harry an idea to get rid of her.

As she grows, Nancy becomes more self-confident and strong-willed, empowered by her new strength over everyone else. Eventually, she invites Harry to dinner and discuss her physical, mental and emotional growth. She thinks it will make their marriage stronger and she has a number of other ideas. However, Harry speculates that more stress will overload her heart and blood pressure and that she will die, leaving the family business and its money to him.

Harry, pretending to be unhinged by Nancy's suggestions (but carrying out his plan to overload her heart so that she dies), deliberately insults and angers her so much that she faints from the stress, crashing into the stable. Escaping to Honey's salon, he celebrates Nancy's apparent death by offering her Nancy's diamond necklace. Nancy wakes up and searches through the town for Harry. She passes a drive-through theater showing Attack of the 50 Foot Woman.

Finding Honey and Harry, she grabs Honey but spares her, telling her she doesn’t have to act stupid. Harry hides under the desk in pure fear. He crawls away, feeling more scared then he has ever felt; Nancy is back for revenge. Trying not to scream or cry, he runs to his car. Nancy follows him and dumps him in her hand. Capturing Harry, she flees into the desert with National Guard helicopters pursuing her. Stopped by some high voltage power lines and confronted by her father and the authorities, she asserts herself and announces her father's ambitions to buy out the town using her money.

Due to a miscommunication from the sheriff a sniper on the helicopter shoots Nancy. Taking a direct hit, she falls onto the power lines, but is rescued and taken away (with Harry still in her grip) by the UFO, proving her claims were real.

The crowds disperse, with Honey making a business agreement with Hamilton. Dr. Cushing explains to the press that wherever Nancy is, she now has Harry all to herself. Inside the UFO, Harry is forced to undergo therapy with two other men under a tiny dome, watched over by Nancy and two other giantesses, and the spaceship flies away into the night.

Cast
 Daryl Hannah as Nancy Cobb Archer
 Daniel Baldwin as Harry Archer
 William Windom as Hamilton Cobb
 Frances Fisher as Dr. Theodora Cushing
 Cristi Conaway as Louise "Honey" Parker
 Paul Benedict as Dr. Victor Loeb
 O'Neal Compton as Sheriff Denby
 Victoria Haas as Deputy Charlotte "Charlie" Spooner
 Lewis Arquette as Mr. Ingersol
 Xander Berkeley as Second Man
 Hamilton Camp as Prospector Eddie
 Kye Benson as Alien Woman #2
 Berta Waagfjord as Alien Woman #1

Reception
Brian Gusse of Rovi writes, "This made-for-cable remake of the cult favorite 1958 film of the same name is updated with an even more feminist slant and has a more thoughtful (and clever) script".

References

External links
 
 

1993 television films
1993 films
1993 comedy films
1993 science fiction films
1990s English-language films
1990s feminist films
1990s monster movies
1990s science fiction comedy films
American feminist comedy films
Remakes of American films
American films about revenge
American monster movies
American science fiction comedy films
American science fiction television films
Comedy film remakes
American comedy television films
Films about adultery in the United States
Films about size change
Films directed by Christopher Guest
Films produced by Debra Hill
Films scored by Nicholas Pike
Films shot in California
Giant monster films
HBO Films films
Science fiction film remakes
1990s American films